Since its first edition held in 1951, athletics events have been competed at the Pan American Games. The events list follows the Olympic model as the Games are an IOC sanctioned competition.

Results

Medal table

See also
International athletics championships and games
List of Pan American Games records in athletics
List of Pan American Games medalists in athletics (men)
List of Pan American Games medalists in athletics (women)

External links
Official Games site

 
Pan American Games
Athletics